Dionysos or Dionysus is a god in Greek mythology.

Dionysos or Dionysus may also refer to:

Film
Dionysos (film), a 1984 French comedy film
Dionysus (film), a 1970 film

Music

Bands
Dionysos (American band), a rock band formed in 2002
Dionysos (Canadian band), a rock band formed in 1967
Dionysos (French band), a rock band formed in 1993
Dionysus (band), a Swedish/German power metal band

Other music
Dionysos (album), a 2004 album by Lux Occulta
Dionysos (opera), a 2010 opera by Wolfgang Rihm
"Dionysus" (song), by BTS

Other uses
3671 Dionysus, an asteroid
Dionysus (Marvel Comics), a character in the Marvel Universe
Dionysos, Greece, north suburb of Athens.

See also
Dionysius (disambiguation)
Saint Dionysius (disambiguation)
Theatre of Dionysus, an ancient Greek theatre